Mona Meshram is an Indian cricketer. She is a right handed batter and right-arm medium bowler.

Meshram was a part of the Indian team to reach the 2017 Women's Cricket World Cup Final at Lords. India were all out for 219. They lost to England  by nine runs.

Award
 She was the recipient of the BCCI’s M.A. Chidambaram Award for being the best Junior lady cricketer of the 2010–11 season (623 runs at 103.83 in 8 matches, inclusive of  one century and 5 half centuries).

References

1991 births
Living people
Cricketers from Nagpur
Indian women cricketers
India women One Day International cricketers
India women Twenty20 International cricketers
Railways women cricketers
Sportswomen from Maharashtra
Vidarbha women cricketers
IPL Supernovas cricketers